The Secret Face is a 1991 Turkish drama film written and directed by Ömer Kavur. It was screened in competition at the 48th Venice International Film Festival.

Cast 

 Zuhal Olcay 
 Fikret Kuşkan
 Sevda Ferdağ
 Savaş Yurttaş

References

External links

1991 films
1991 drama films
Turkish drama films
1990s Turkish-language films